John Robinson Conniff, Sr. (January 20, 1874 – January 20, 1957) was an educator from New Orleans, Louisiana, who served from 1926 to 1928 as the seventh president of Louisiana Tech University in Ruston in Lincoln Parish in North Louisiana.

Background

Conniff was the oldest of five children born in  New Orleans to the former Mary Orleana Robinson (1850-1917), whose family tree is traced to a family in colonial Delaware, and John Harris Conniff (1850-1909), the president of the Crescent News and Hotel Company with interests also in the New Orleans entertainment industry—the St. Charles Theatre, the Academy of Music, and the Grand Opera House. The senior Coniffs are interred at Greenwood Cemetery in New Orleans.

Young Coniff graduated in 1890 from the high school of Roman Catholic-affiliated Tulane University. In 1894, he received a Bachelor of Arts degree from Tulane, where he became affiliated with Phi Delta Theta fraternity. Conniff then studied law for a year at the University of Virginia in Charlottesville, Virginia.

Academic career

From 1895 to 1900, Conniff taught English and Latin at Boys' High School in New Orleans; from 1900 to 1908, he was assistant superintendent of New Orleans public schools and from 1908 to 1910 the acting superintendent. In 1910, he moved to Baton Rouge to head the teacher certification division of the Louisiana Department of Education under superintendent T. H. Harris.

Conniff was a devotee of physical education and was the president of the first Tulane Baseball League and the Southern Athletic Club of New Orleans. In 1905, he helped to establish the Public School Athletic League of New Orleans and served as its long-term secretary. Considering his father's ownership of entertainment enterprises, Conniff participated in theatrical performances in New Orleans and Baton Rouge, where he helped to create the Little Theatre Guild. In 1923, while working at the state education department, Conniff received his Master of Arts degree from Louisiana State University in Baton Rouge. His thesis entails a study of English drama and theatrical performances prior to 1642.

Like his father, Conniff was an active Democrat and a member of the National Education Association and the former white-only Louisiana Teachers Association, since the biracial Louisiana Association of Educators. He was a member of  the Baton Rouge Golf and Country Club. Conniff relocated from Baton Rouge to Ruston in 1926 to become the president of Louisiana Tech, having succeeded John Ephraim Keeny, who stepped down after eighteen years at the helm.

On leaving Louisiana Tech after two years at the helm, Conniff returned to New Orleans, where he joined the faculty of the all-male Warren Easton High School, now a charter school. At Warren Easton, Conniff resumed his teaching of English and Latin. During summers he taught the History of Louisiana at his alma mater, Tulane University.

Death

Conniff and his wife, the former Bertha Drott (1882-1971), had one son, John R. Conniff, Jr. (1906-1968). Conniff died on his 83rd birthday, also the day of the second inauguration of U.S. President Dwight D. Eisenhower. The couple is interred at Garden of Memories in Metairie in Jefferson Parish in suburban New Orleans. John Coniff, Jr., however, is interred at St. Louis Cemetery No. 3 in New Orleans.

References

 

1874 births
1957 deaths
People from New Orleans
People from Baton Rouge, Louisiana
People from Ruston, Louisiana
Tulane University alumni
University of Virginia School of Law alumni
Louisiana State University alumni
Presidents of Louisiana Tech University
Louisiana Democrats